OIV may refer to:
  or International Organisation of Vine and Wine
 Organismo Italiano di Valutazione or Italian Business Valuation Society

See also
 S-OIV or Swine influenza